Karl Friedrich Erich Haupt (8 July 1841 – 19 February 1910) was a German Lutheran theologian.

Biography
He was born at Stralsund, and educated at Berlin. He later worked as a schoolteacher in Kolberg and Treptow an der Rega. He was a professor of New Testament exegesis, successively at Kiel (from 1878), Greifswald (from 1883), and Halle (from 1888), where in 1902 he was named university rector.

He was successor to Willibald Beyschlag as chairman of the main association of the Gustav-Adolf-Stiftung, and from 1901 to 1908 was editor of the "Deutsch-evangelischen Blätter". For a period of time, he served as head of the Evangelischen Bundes (Protestant Federation).

Works
 Der erste Brief des Johannes (“First Epistle of John”; 1869).
 Die alttestamentlichen Citate in den vier Evangelien (“Citations of the Old Testament in the four gospels"; 1871).
 Die Kirche und die theologische Lehrfreiheit (“The church and freedom of theological teaching”; 1881).
 Plus ultra, zur Universitätsfrage (2nd ed., 1890).
 Die Bedeutung der heiligen Schrift für den evangelischen Christen (“The meaning of the Holy Scripture for Lutherans”; 1891).
 Zum Verständnis des Apostolats im Neuen Testament ("To the understanding of the Apostolates in the New Testament"; 1896).

References

External links
 

German Lutheran theologians
1841 births
1910 deaths
People from Stralsund
Humboldt University of Berlin alumni
Academic staff of the University of Kiel
Academic staff of the University of Greifswald
Academic staff of the University of Halle
19th-century German Protestant theologians
German male non-fiction writers
19th-century male writers
19th-century Lutherans